Hue and cry is a common law process where bystanders are summoned to help apprehend a criminal.

Hue and Cry may also refer to:
 Hue and Cry (album), a 1994 jazz album by Bobby Previte
 Hue and Cry (band), a Scottish pop duo formed in 1983
 Hue and Cry (film), a 1947 British comedy directed by Charles Crichton
 Hue and Cry (newspaper), a London newspaper
 Hue and Cry, a cultivar of Iris ensata, the Japanese iris

See also
The Hue and Cry After Cupid, a masque first performed in 1608